Franklin Osgood Barnes  was an American lawyer and politician who served as a Member of the Massachusetts House of Representatives.

Notes

1841 births
Massachusetts city council members
Politicians from Chelsea, Massachusetts
People of Massachusetts in the American Civil War
Republican Party members of the Massachusetts House of Representatives
1900 deaths
Lawyers from Chelsea, Massachusetts
19th-century American politicians
19th-century American lawyers